The canton of Pélissanne is an administrative division of the Bouches-du-Rhône department, in southeastern France. At the French canton reorganisation which came into effect in March 2015, it was expanded from 8 to 13 communes. Its seat is in Pélissanne.

It consists of the following communes: 

Alleins 
Aurons
La Barben
Charleval
Éguilles
Lambesc
Mallemort
Pélissanne
Rognes
La Roque-d'Anthéron
Saint-Cannat
Saint-Estève-Janson
Vernègues

References

Cantons of Bouches-du-Rhône